The HDL-Atherosclerosis Treatment Study, also known as HATS, was a three-year double-blind trial involving 160 people with coronary heart disease (CHD) who had a low HDL and near normal LDL. The study compared  a combination of simvastatin and niacin with antioxidant vitamin therapy. Using angiography, coronary artery stenosis progressed when using placebo or antioxidant alone, and regressed with the combination of simvastatin and niacin. The study demonstrated a 90% reduction in CHD death, nonfatal heart attacks, stroke, or revascularization for worsening angina. It was published in 2001.

See also
 Heart Protection Study
 Scandinavian Simvastatin Survival Study

References

Epidemiological study projects
Clinical trials related to cardiology
Statins
Cardiology